Uruli ( ഉരുളി) is a traditional cookware extensively used South Indian states of Tamil Nadu, Kerala and a few neighbouring places. It is also pronounced as Urli and commonly made of clay, copper and bronze. Urulis were used in home for cooking and in ayurvedha to make medicines. Now Urulis are used as a decorative bowl to float flowers which is a part of South Indian tradition.

The uruli can be found in many traditional Tamil and Malayali homes, which show them in several sizes, like the small ones that have a more decorative function or also the very large “varpul”,that are used for cooking in big occasions that require a big amount of food. With its shallow circular shape this vessel is also used to display flower decor in traditional Tamil households and for the kani for the Malayalam New Year Vishu and these days, it is present in many resorts and hotel decorations.

Photo gallery

See also
 Cuisine of Kerala
 Kerala
 List of cooking vessels

Indian food preparation utensils
Cooking vessels